

The Picture House Regional Film Center, formerly known as the "Pelham Picture House", is a historic movie theater located at Pelham, Westchester County, New York. The rectangular building was built in 1921, in the Spanish Revival style and is oriented at an angle at the northwest corner of Wolf's Lane and Brookside Avenue.  It features angled end bays, a distinctive round arched entrance, tiled hoods over the large windows on the end bays, and a wood open truss ceiling in the auditorium. The building typifies early 20th century commercial architecture of New York City commuter suburbs with its eclectic style reflective of the Mission style.

The theater was privately owned until it was put up for sale in 2003. Fearing that the historic building would be torn down, concerned Westchester citizens formed a nonprofit (originally Pelham Picture House Preservation, the name was changed to The Picture House Regional Film Center in 2005) and bought the building. The Picture House operates with film and education programming at the 175 Wolfs Lane location and in area schools. The theater also hosts birthday parties.

It was added to the National Register of Historic Places in 2010.

See also
National Register of Historic Places listings in southern Westchester County, New York

References

Further reading
 Dieriekx, Mary. "Pelham Downtown Historic District." Draft National Register of Historic Places Registration Form, 2009
 Sanchis, Frank E. American Architecture: Westchester County, New York. Harrison, New York: Harbor Hills Books, 1977

External links
The Picture House website

Pelham, New York
Theatres on the National Register of Historic Places in New York (state)
Spanish Colonial Revival architecture in New York (state)
Theatres completed in 1921
Buildings and structures in Westchester County, New York
Tourist attractions in Westchester County, New York
National Register of Historic Places in Westchester County, New York